Our Grand Despair is a 2011 Turkish drama film, directed by Seyfi Teoman, about two flatmates who reluctantly take in their friend's traumatised sister.  The film premiered in competition at the 61st Berlin International Film Festival.

Cast
 Ilker Aksum as Ender
 Fatih Al as Cetin
 Gunes Sayin as Nihal
 Taner Birsel as Murat - Cetin's brother
 Baki Davrak as Fikret - Nihal's brother
 Mehmet Ali Nuroglu as Bora - Nihal's boyfriend

References

External links
 

2011 films
2011 drama films
Films set in Turkey
2010s Turkish-language films
Films based on Turkish novels
Turkish drama films
Films shot in Ankara